The  was a security checkpoint which was established by the Tokugawa Shogunate on the Tōkaidō highway connecting the capital of Edo with Kyoto in Edo period Japan. In 1921, the site was recognized as a National Historic Site, and in recognition that it had only surviving Edo-period checkpoint structure remaining in the country, its status was upgraded to that of a Special National Historic Site in 1962.

Overview
Located between Maisaka-juku and Arai-juku, in what is now the city of Kosai, Shizuoka Prefecture, the Arai Barrier was strategically positioned on the narrow strip of land between Lake Hamana and the Pacific Ocean, and was the only checkpoint on the Tōkaidō intended for travelers both by land and by water. All travelers were required to submit to an examination of their travel permits, and taxes were levied on commercial travelers with merchandise. From 1696, the post was to be held by two men who served in alternate years; however, the position was abolished in 1702 and the Arai Barrier was thereafter managed by Yoshida Domain on behalf of the shogunate. 

The initial checkpoint, built in the year 1600, was destroyed by a tsunami during the Genroku period (1688-1703) and rebuilt only to be destroyed again during the 1707 Hōei earthquake. It was then moved to its current location on the western shore of Lake Hamana. The structures were rebuilt again after the 1854 Ansei-Tōkai earthquake. 

The main building is a single-story structure facing south, with Irimoya gambrel sides and a tiled roof. It is long from east to west, and is divided into several rooms within.

Following the Meiji Restoration, the barrier was abolished in 1869, and its buildings were converted for use as an elementary school, followed by government offices until 1951.

The main building was restored in 1971, and additional buildings, such as gates and a pier, were re-created in 1998 on their original foundations as part of a museum.

Gallery

See also
List of Historic Sites of Japan (Shizuoka)

References
Carey, Patrick. Rediscovering the Old Tokaido:In the Footsteps of Hiroshige. Global Books UK (2000). 
Nenzi, Laura. Excursions in Identity: Travel and the Intersection of Place, Gender, and Status in Edo Japan. University of Hawaii Press (2008) 
Taganau, Jilly. The Tokaido Road: Travelling and Representation in Edo and Meiji Japan. RoutledgeCurzon (2004). 
Vaporis, Constantine. Breaking Barriers: Travel and the State in Early Modern Japan, Harvard University Asia Center (1995).

External links

Shiuoka Prefecture home page
Kosai city home page

Notes

Special Historic Sites
1600 establishments in Japan
Museums in Shizuoka Prefecture
Tourist attractions in Shizuoka Prefecture
Kosai, Shizuoka